The First National Bank in Rhinelander, Wisconsin was built in 1911.  It is a Sullivanesque building designed by architects Purcell & Elmslie.  It was listed on the National Register of Historic Places in 1973.

References

External links

Commercial buildings completed in 1911
Buildings and structures in Oneida County, Wisconsin
Bank buildings on the National Register of Historic Places in Wisconsin
1911 establishments in Wisconsin
National Register of Historic Places in Oneida County, Wisconsin